The 2001 Bangalore Mahanagara Palike (Bangalore City Corporation) election was held on 11 November 2001 in all 100 Wards of Bangalore

Background 
The tenure of the Bangalore Mahanagara Palike ended on 23 November 2001. A new election was necessary to elect new Corporators and Mayor

Organization 
New Mayor will be elected for a term of one year and Corporators will be in office for 5 years

Schedule 
The schedule of the election was announced by the State Election Commission on 3 October 2011. It announced that polling would be held in a single phase on 11 November and that results would be declared on 12 November 2001. It also declared that the provisions of the Model Code of Conduct came into force with immediate effect" with the said announcement.

Results

List of winning candidates

Results summary

See also 
 List of wards in Bangalore (1995-2006)
 List of wards in Bangalore
 Elections in Karnataka
 Bangalore Mahanagara Palike

References

2000s in Karnataka
2000s in Bangalore
Elections in Bangalore
2001 elections in India